Owolabi Franck Saturnin Allagbé Kassifa (born 22 November 1993) is a Beninese professional footballer who plays as a goalkeeper for French Ligue 2 club Dijon FCO and the Benin national team.

Club career
Prior to joining Niort in the summer of 2014, Allagbé had played his whole career with the Beninese side ASPA Cotonou.

On 22 July 2021, he joined Ligue 2 club Valenciennes on loan. On 10 January 2022, the loan was terminated early following Anthony Racioppi's departure from Dijon.

International career
As of February 2020, he has won 18 caps for the Benin national football team. He played at the 2019 Africa Cup of Nations, where Benin reached the quarter-finals.

Career statistics

Club

International

References

External links
 Saturnin Allagbé profile at the Chamois Niortais official website

1993 births
Living people
Beninese footballers
Benin international footballers
People from Collines Department
Association football goalkeepers
ASPAC FC players
Chamois Niortais F.C. players
Dijon FCO players
Valenciennes FC players
2019 Africa Cup of Nations players
Championnat National 3 players
Ligue 2 players
Ligue 1 players
Beninese expatriate footballers
Expatriate footballers in France
Beninese expatriate sportspeople in France
Benin youth international footballers